The Passion According to G.H. (A paixão segundo G.H.) is a mystical novel by Brazilian writer Clarice Lispector, published in 1964. The work takes the form of a monologue by a woman, identified only as G.H., telling of the crisis that ensued the previous day after she crushed a cockroach in the door of a wardrobe. Its canonical status was recognized in 1988 by its inclusion in the Arquivos Collection, the UNESCO series of critical editions of the greatest works of Latin American literature. It has been translated into English twice, the first time in 1988 by Ronald W. Sousa, and then by Idra Novey in 2012.

Background and publication
The novel was written in a quick burst at the end of 1963, following a period of difficulty in Lispector's life. "It's strange," she remembered, "because I was in the worst of situations, sentimentally as well as in my family, everything complicated, and I wrote The Passion, which has nothing to do with that." The novel was published in the following year by Editora do Author, which was run by Lispector's friends Rubem Braga and Fernando Sabino.

Plot summary
When the book opens, G.H., a well-to-do resident of a Rio de Janeiro penthouse, reminisces on what happened to her the previous day, when she decided to clean out the room occupied by the maid, who had just quit.

"Before I entered the room, what was I?" G.H. asks. "I was what others had always seen me be, and that was the way I knew myself."

In the maid's room, G.H. expects chaos. Instead, to her shock, she finds a desert; "an entirely clean and vibrating room as in an insane asylum from which dangerous objects have been removed".

Only one thing disturbs the room's perfect order: black carbon scratches on the dry white wall, outlining a man, a woman, and a dog. Pondering the inscrutable drawing, she realizes that the black maid, whose name she initially forgets, and whose face she has trouble calling to mind, had hated her. Overwhelmed by anger, she opens the door to the wardrobe. Terrified by the cockroach she sees emerging, she slams the door shut, severing the cockroach in its centre, and sees the still-living animal's entrails beginning to ooze out.

G.H. is appalled by the sight, but she is trapped in the room by the irresistible fascination for the dying insect. She wants to scream, but she knows it is already too late: "If I raised the alarm at being alive, voiceless and hard they would drag me away since they drag away those who depart the possible world, the exceptional being is dragged away, the screaming being [sic]."

Staring at the insect, her human personality begins to break down; finally, at the height of her mystic crisis, she famously takes the matter oozing from the cockroach — the fundamental, anonymous matter of the universe which she shares with the roach — and puts it in her mouth.

Literary significance and criticism
The book's dénouement has made it famous in Brazil, but it is its description of the breakdown of G.H.'s personality and the mystical crisis, couched in Lispector's unmistakable language, that has made the novel one of the most important works of Brazilian fiction.

Shortly before her death, Lispector told a reporter that of all her books G.H. was the one that "best corresponded to her demands as a writer". Many critics have agreed, and few Brazilian authors have failed to comment on it, as the extensive bibliography in the UNESCO edition, edited by philosopher Benedito Nunes, indicates.

Ronald W. Sousa, translator of the novel from Portuguese to English, re-examines the way most criticism addresses the key issue of the language dynamics of the novel.  Rather than seeing the dynamics in a Romantic or avant-garde position, Sousa poses that Lispector does not seek to remake language but rather seeks to work within it.  Throughout the novel,  "G.H. explores before our eyes some of the key oppositions upon which language is built."

Footnotes

External links
 New York Times: "Everything happens in the maid's room". Review of the English translation.
 Levilson C. Reis. "G. H., Janair, and the Mulata: Race and Gender in Lispector's The Passion According to G. H." Notes on Contemporary Literature 35.2 (2005): 7–9.

1964 Brazilian novels
Novels by Clarice Lispector
Portuguese-language novels
Novels set in Rio de Janeiro (city)
Fictional cockroaches